Auhagen is a municipality in Lower Saxony, Germany.

Auhagen may also refer to:

 Auhagen, a rail model accessories manufacturer based in Marienberg, Germany
 Wolfgang Auhagen (born 1953), German musicologist
 Ulrike Auhagen (born 1967), German classical philologist